John Henry Mears (May 22, 1878 – July 26, 1956) was an American who made the record for the fastest trip around the world in both 1913 and 1928. He was also a Broadway producer.

Biography
He was born on May 22, 1878 in Massachusetts.

On July 2, 1913, he left New York City on the RMS Mauretania, then traveled by a combination of steamers, yachts, and trains to circumnavigate the Earth and reach New York City again on August 6, 1913. He had an elapsed time of 35 days, 21 hours, 35 minutes, 18 and four-fifths seconds. His  world record stood for 13 years. In 1928, he set the record again at 23 days 15 hours 21 minutes and 3 seconds. In the same year he wrote an autobiography called Racing the Moon.

After the Graf Zeppelin broke his record in 1929, he made one last attempt in 1930. He had to abandon the trip after the airplane he was on was damaged during takeoff.

He died at Hollywood Presbyterian Hospital in Los Angeles on July 26, 1956.

1913 Itinerary
United States: New York City from the offices of the New York Sun newspaper on July 2, 1913
Atlantic crossing: via the steamer "Mauretania"
England: Fishguard, London & Dover via train
France: Calais via channel steamer, Paris via train
Germany: Berlin via train
Russia: St Petersburg & Omsk via train
China: Harbin, Manchuria & Mukden via train
Korea: Pusan via train
Japan: Shimonoseki via steamer & Tokyo via train
Pacific crossing: via the steamer "Empress of Russia"
Canada: Victoria, British Columbia where he left steamer en route and boarded a yacht. Left yacht en route and boarded a hydroplane
United States: Seattle, Washington, St Paul, Minnesota, Chicago Illinois, Cleveland, Ohio & New York City back to the offices of the New York Sun newspaper via train

References

External links

Circumnavigators of the globe
1878 births
1956 deaths
People from Massachusetts
American theatre managers and producers